Valley High School is a 9th-12th-grade college preparatory high school located in Sacramento, California, near the city limits of Elk Grove, California. The school was established in 1977 as part of the Elk Grove Unified School District. Valley's mascot is the Viking and their cross town rivals are Elk Grove High School and Florin High School.

History
Valley was Elk Grove's second comprehensive and traditional high school. The new school was built to serve the northern part of the huge  district, which covered a large portion of south Sacramento. The name chosen for the high school was intended to reflect the Valley Hi community, which was then one of the newer subdivisions in the south area.

Academics 
The school has increased the number of students completing A-G requirements from 21 percent in 2005 to 30 percent in 2007. The number of Valley High School students who successfully completed CSU applications rose by 56 percent from 2005 to 2007. The number of students taking the PSAT rose from a 4 percent participation rate in 2005–2006 to 80 percent in 2007–2008. During the same time period, the EGUSD participation rate rose from 16 percent to 79 percent in 2007–2008. The numbers of students participating are now far higher than the state level at 34 percent and the nation at 37 percent.

In 2013, the Health TECH Academy launched the state's first high school-based community health worker training program.  Health TECH chw trainees participate in various community events and serve as paid interns with health providers.

Academic competitions

National History Day 

In the National History Day program, participants from Valley High have reached the national finals a number of times. In 1997, a student won second place in the Senior Individual Exhibit category. In 1998, a group won third in the Senior Group Exhibit, and one student won third in Senior Individual Exhibit. In 2007, three students won second place in the Senior Group Exhibit category.

Notable alumni

Athletics
 Robert Awalt - NFL, tight end
 Rae Carruth - NFL, wide receiver.
 Jerry DeLoach - NFL, defensive tackle
 Keith Lewis - NFL, safety
 Charles Mann - NFL, defensive tackle Super Bowl Champion
 Jamie Nieto - 3-time Olympic high jumper
 Jeremiah Pharms - college football player
 Marshall Sperbeck - football coach
 Fernando Viña - MLB, infielder
 Damen Wheeler - American football player

Politics
 George A. Plescia - State Assemblyman, former Republican leader

Music
 J. Charles E. Brown - Band Master, Chief Executive Conductor of the Brooklyn Music and Leadership Institute -

Mr. Brown’s bands have been featured in documentaries and movies, achieving distinction in New York City as the leader of the largest band in the city’s history. As Conductor of the East Coast Ocean of Soul and Tidal Wave War Drums, Brown’s bands have performed at Madison Square Garden, Cipriani’s Times Square, Baruch College, Wagner College, Manhattan Center, many of New York City’s major parades, and throughout the Southern and Northeastern regions of the United States. Accolades have come in the form of regional and national titles and awards. 

Advanced repertoire include Fantasie Brilliante sur Carmen, Cecile Chaminade’s Concertino, Haydn’s Serenade, Mozart Quartet in D Major K285, Caprice No. 24 Paganini. Jonas-Charles E. Brown resides in New York City and is a graduate of the Valley High School Teacher’s Academy, and alumnus of Grambling State University. Jonas also holds alumni membership with Phi Mu Alpha Sinfonia Fraternity of America, Omicron Lambda.

Theater
 Kami Lucas - Analyst, Lucas Institute for the Gifted

References

External links 
 Official website

Educational institutions established in 1977
High schools in Sacramento, California
Public high schools in California
1977 establishments in California